Marlan is a registered trademark for inherent flame retardant fabric (UNE EN 11612) used in protective clothing for foundries.

It was developed in 1997 and marketed by Marina Textil since 1998 conceived to protect against molten metal splashes including aluminium, cryolite, iron, steel, copper, magnesium, glass etc.

Marlan is a blend of different fibers, which includes wool and FR (flame retardant) cellulose fiber.

Properties

The fabric is inherent meaning that the protection is not reduced through continuous use or washing and its properties remain unalterable  throughout its life. The characteristics of the natural fibers give inherent protection and comfort.

According to the European Standard EN 373 or the new one EN ISO 9185 the fabric has the maximum value D3 for protection against aluminium splashes and E3 for iron splashes. The wool blend with a flame retardant fiber provides thermal insulation characteristics while avoiding the molten metal sticking to the fabric, which was the main problem of pure synthetic or natural fibers used in the past.

Types

Currently there are different types and developments of Marlan, developed according to specific risks in foundries:
Marlan AL600 (EN ISO 6942), Aluminized fabric – protection against radiant heat
Marlan HV (EN 471) High visibility – protection against invisibility of the worker 
Marlan SX (EN 11612) with ceramic – protection against high impact molten metal splashes.

Notes

References 
Aluminium World, 2008, "Protective Clothing to Meet all Levels of Risk Encountered by Aluminium Workers", Aluminium World, p. 82-83,
"Marlan" Sovereign Publications, Retrieved 2008-04-01
"Marlan, protección frente a las salpicaduras de metal fundido" Protección Laboral, Retrieved 2008-04-01
"Protective Clothing for Industry" Health&Safety International, Retrieved 2008-05-26
 marinatextil.net
"https://www.youtube.com/user/MarinaTextil/videos"

,

Brand name materials
Flame retardant fabrics
Technical fabrics